Mary Azarian (born 1940) is an American woodcut artist and children's book illustrator. She won the 1999 Caldecott Medal for U.S. picture book illustration, recognizing Snowflake Bentley by Jacqueline Briggs Martin. It tells about the life of Wilson Bentley. She lives in Calais, Vermont. She produces original prints and has illustrated over 50 books.

Early life

Azarian grew up on her grandfather's farm on the outskirts of Washington, DC. Her grandfather’s farm had thousands of chicken along with geese that would bother the customers that came to buy his eggs. Azarian’s uncle grew vegetables. Being around her family gardens sparked her lifelong interest in nature. When she was young, she would spend her time exploring the woods and fields with her pony named Pasty.

She began drawing and painting at an early age. In 4th grade, she did her first relief print of woodcuts. This piece of art was a  lino block of an angel with the name NOEL at the bottom. She ran into a problem and learned a valuable lesson from this project; words must be reversed when doing a woodcut. Her finished product read LEON.

Education

Azarian continued to lino cuts until she later attended Smith College, where she studied printmaking and painting with one of the great 20th century printmakers, Leonard Baskin.

Career

After she graduated from Smith College, she moved to farm in Vermont. Azarian and her husband raised horses, oxen, chickens, a jersey milk cow, a sheep, and a goat with the help of their three sons.

Before beginning her career as a full-time artist, Azarian taught in a one-room schoolhouse for three years. After she finished her three years of teaching, she decided she wanted to make a living selling woodcut prints. She began producing her prints by hand and in black and white. Eventually, she began adding color to her prints by hand. Finally, she found an old Vandercook proof press and began using it to produce the prints.

In the 1970s, Azarian began illustrating children’s books.  In 1999, the American Library Association awarded Azarian the Caldecott Medal for her illustrations in the children's book, Snowflake Bentley.

Family

Mary Azarian is married to her husband Tom and together they have three sons. She also has four grandchildren.

Selected works
Snowflake Bentley, written by Jacqueline Briggs Martin
A Farmer's Alphabet
Barn Cat
The Four Seasons of Mary Azarian
When the Moon is Full

References

External links

 
 Mary Azarian at National Center for Children's Illustrated Literature
 Britannica Student Encyclopedia 
 Printmaking Demonstration by Mary Azarian, contributed by Sharon Barrett Kennedy 2002
  Video: Woodcut Artist Mary Azarian

 

1940 births
American children's writers
American women illustrators
American people of Armenian descent
Caldecott Medal winners
American children's book illustrators
People from Plainfield, Vermont
Smith College alumni
Living people
Date of birth missing (living people)